Hillcrest is a historic home located at Lima in Livingston County, New York. It is a two-story painted brick dwelling constructed in 1838–1840.  Stylistically, the house is a combination of Federal and Greek Revival design entrance. In 1902-1903 the semicircular three-bay portico was added to the front entrance.  Also on the property is a gazebo constructed from the remains of the privy and carriage barn.

It was listed on the National Register of Historic Places in 1980.

References

Houses on the National Register of Historic Places in New York (state)
Federal architecture in New York (state)
Houses completed in 1840
Houses in Livingston County, New York
National Register of Historic Places in Livingston County, New York